Buffalo Commercial Bank (BCB) is a commercial bank in South Sudan. It is one of the commercial banks licensed by the Bank of South Sudan, the national banking regulator.

Overview
The bank is an indigenous South Sudanese financial institution, serving the banking needs of the people and businesses of this part of the world. It is a small but growing private commercial bank headquartered in Juba, the capital and largest city in South Sudan.

History
Buffalo Commercial Bank was established in 2008, following the cessation of hostilities between Sudan and South Sudan and the signing of the Comprehensive Peace Agreement (CPA) in Naivasha, Kenya, in 2005.

Ownership
The bank's stock is privately owned. , the detailed shareholding is not publicly known.

Branch network
The branch network of the bank include the following locations:

 Malakia Branch - Juba
 Juba Market Branch - Juba Main Branch
 Wazarat Branch - Ministerial Premises, Juba
 Wau Branch - Wau

Governance
The Bank is governed by a nine-member Board of Directors. The current chairman of the Board is Lual Acuek Lual Deng.

External links
 Website of Buffalo Commercial Bank
 Website of Bank of Southern Sudan
 List of Financial Institutions Operating In Southern Sudan

See also
 List of banks in South Sudan
 Central Bank of South Sudan
 Economy of South Sudan

References

Banks of South Sudan
Banks established in 2008
Companies based in Juba